Marc-Andrea Hüsler was the defending champion but lost in the first round to Mats Rosenkranz.

Oscar Otte won the title after defeating Lukáš Lacko 6–4, 6–4 in the final.

Seeds

Draw

Finals

Top half

Bottom half

References

External links
Main draw
Qualifying draw

Wolffkran Open - 1
2021 Singles